Uvariodendron anisatum is a species of plant in the family Annonaceae. It is endemic to Kenya.  It is threatened by habitat loss.

References

anisatum
Endemic flora of Kenya
Vulnerable flora of Africa
Taxonomy articles created by Polbot